Abacetus rubidus is a species of ground beetle in the subfamily Pterostichinae. It was described by Burgeon in 1935.

References

rubidus
Beetles described in 1935